Ambermo may be,

the Mamberamo River
the supposed 'Ambermo' language